The Oklahoma state elections was held on Election Day, November 6, 2012 for a number of offices. The Presidential Preferential Primary Election will be held on March 6, 2012 and the Primary Election will be held on June 26, 2012.

President

US Representatives

All five Oklahoma seats in the United States House of Representatives are up for election in 2012.

Corporation Commissioner
One seat on the Oklahoma Corporation Commission is up for election in 2012.

State legislature

Senate

24 of the 48 seats in the Oklahoma Senate are up for election in 2012.

House of Representatives

All 101 seats in the Oklahoma House of Representatives are up for election in 2012.

Judicial
These races are "retention" votes based on Oklahoma's use of the Missouri Plan for electing judicial nominees.

Oklahoma Supreme Court

Oklahoma Court of Criminal Appeals

Oklahoma Court of Civil Appeals

References

External links
Oklahoma Election Board
Oklahoma at Ballotpedia
Oklahoma judicial elections, 2012 at Judgepedia
Oklahoma 2012 campaign finance data from OpenSecrets
Oklahoma Congressional Races in 2012 campaign finance data from OpenSecrets
Outside spending at the Sunlight Foundation

 
Oklahoma